The House of Wielopolski (plural: Wielopolscy, feminine form: Wielopolska) was a Polish szlachta family, magnates in the 17th and 18th centuries.

Coat of arms
The Wielopolski family used the Starykoń coat of arms.

Notable members
 Elżbieta Bobola née Wielopolska
 Aleksander Wielopolski
 Alfred Wielopolski
 Franciszek Wielopolski
 Jan Wielopolski (c. 1630-1688)
 Jan Wielopolski the elder
 Jan Wielopolski (1700–1773)
 Józef Stanisław Wielopolski
 Kasper Wielopolski
 Zygmunt Andrzej Wielopolski
 Helena Wielopolska wife of Clemens Scivoli (beginning of the 19th century in Malta)

Palaces

See also
 Ordynacja Pińczowska

Bibliography
 Jerzy Sewer Dunin Borkowski, Almanach błękitny: genealogia żyjących rodów polskich, 1908. str 974

External links
  History of the Ordynacja Pińczowska